Jessica Chobot (born Jessica Lynn Horn; July 7, 1977) is an American on-camera host and writer. She has hosted the IGN shows IGN Strategize and Weekly Wood, which also runs on Xbox Live; she previously worked as presenter of the IGN Daily Fix. Since 2013, she was the primary host of Nerdist News and Nerdist News Talks Back for Nerdist Industries. In 2014, she launched her own podcast titled Bizarre States.  She left Nerdist on August 5, 2019. She currently stars in a show called Expedition X.

Early life
Jessica Lynn Horn was born in Buffalo, New York, and grew up in Novi, Michigan. Her family moved from town to town frequently during her youth. Before entering high school, she lived in several places on the East Coast and the Midwest.

Career
Chobot gained exposure when Kotaku published a photo of her licking a Sony PSP online in 2005. The photo has been widely parodied since, even appearing on Sony-branded advertising.

In 2006, Chobot was hired full-time by IGN.com to take over hosting responsibilities for the network's IGN Weekly show which is still running. Her segments included stand-up introductions as well as "woman-on-the-street" pieces. Starting in 2009 and ending in 2011, Chobot hosted a daily show titled IGN Daily Fix; the first episode aired March 23, 2009. In addition, she contributes columns, features and reviews and runs a blog on IGN. Chobot is also a former contributor to FHM UK, Mania.com, and has made multiple appearances on G4's Filter and Attack of the Show!. She has also hosted a videogame preview segment for Fuel TV's, The Daily Habit, and co-hosts on Lifeskool TV's, Gamer's Dojo. She also contributes as a weekly guest on Maxim Radio, where she answers caller questions for an hour each Monday. Chobot and Ryan Dunn starred in Proving Ground, a program whose airing cycle was disrupted by Dunn's death in an automotive crash on June 20, 2011, after the end of production; the program was pulled from airing for a month before returning to finish its run beginning on July 19, 2011.

Chobot has appeared on commercials for ADV's Anime Network On Demand cable station, and lent her likeness to Symbiote Studios Toy Company for two limited-edition anime-style sculptures. In addition, she has modeled for the J!NX female gamers clothing line. In 2006-2007, she co-wrote a sci-fi script with writer/director/creator of Tron, Steven Lisberger, for Soul Code. 
Current collaborations include an anime-style collectible figurine in development with Symbiote Studios, a representative of JiNX.com women's apparel line.
Chobot is also writing the "Ask Jess, Dammit!" blog for Maxim.  She was named the 88th most desirable woman of 2008 by AskMen magazine and 14th hottest woman of business 2009 by Business Pundit. Chobot also hosts a weekly show featured on Inside Xbox called IGN Strategize.  In 2011, Chobot placed at #57 in the 2011 Askmen's Top 99 Women poll.

Chobot voiced news reporter Diana Allers, a non-player character modelled in her likeness who is a potential romance option of Commander Shepard, the main character of the 2012 video game Mass Effect 3. Although Chobot hosted a preview of the game for G4 in January 2012, Chobot and the media organizations she worked for at the time had made it known that she would not review the game in any official capacity. Her involvement in the video game was criticized by many as a conflict of interest; in response, Chobot emphasized that she is an on-screen personality who never considered herself to be a journalist, and that BioWare never asked her for any favors in return. In a retrospective comment about the controversy, Chobot noted that she was never asked for her side of the story by people who write about her in the media.

On November 4, 2013, Chobot began work as the main host of Nerdist News, a news show focusing on nerdy pop culture updates airing 5 days a week on Nerdist.com. Chobot served as the writer for Daylight, a survival horror video game by Zombie Studios. The game launched on April 29, 2014. On June 26, 2014, Chobot launched her own podcast dedicated to the weird and supernatural titled Bizarre States. The show is co-hosted by fellow Nerdist Industries's employee Andrew Bowser and features occasional guests.

In 2015, Chobot was the contestant interviewer on the revived sixth series of robotic combat game show Battlebots, and she acted as Samus Aran for the movie Metroid: The Sky Calls, which was produced by a studio named Rainfall. She played the role along with another actress named America Young.
On August 5, 2019, Chobot announced on Twitter that she was leaving Nerdist after six years.
Chobot now stars in Expedition X which premiered on February 12, 2020 on the Discovery Channel.

Personal life
She was divorced from a previous marriage in 2006 but kept the surname Chobot.

On August 21, 2011, Chobot became engaged to Blair Herter and they married on February 18, 2012. They had their first child on March 6, 2013. The family currently lives in the Netherlands, where they moved in 2022 after Herter left G4 and joined Team Liquid.

References

External links

 
 

1977 births
Living people
Television personalities from Buffalo, New York
People from Novi, Michigan
People from Los Angeles County, California
American expatriates in Japan
American expatriates in the Netherlands
American critics
American television hosts
American women television writers
American women television presenters
Female models from New York (state)
American television writers
IGN
Screenwriters from California
Screenwriters from Michigan
Screenwriters from New York (state)
American people in the video game industry
Video game critics
Women video game critics
Women in the video game industry
21st-century American women